Angela Flournoy is an American writer. Her debut novel The Turner House (2015) won the First Novelist Award and was shortlisted for the National Book Award for Fiction, shortlisted for the PEN/Robert W. Bingham Prize for Debut Fiction, nominated for an NAACP Image Award, and named a New York Times Notable Book of 2015. She was also listed on the National Book Awards' 5 under 35 list, nominated by her former teacher ZZ Packer.

Early life and education 
Flournoy was raised in Southern California. Her mother was from Los Angeles and father from Detroit.  Flournoy attended the Iowa Writer's Workshop and the University of Southern California. She started developing her first novel, The Turner House while attending the Iowa Workshop, where she frequently traveled to Detroit to visit her father's family.

Career 
After graduating, Flournoy taught writing for the University of Iowa, Trinity Washington University, and the DC Public Library. She published The Turner House in 2015. The New York Times called it "an engrossing and remarkably mature first novel...assured and memorable." BuzzFeed describes Flournoy as "the most lauded debut novelist in America," noting her many awards and honors, as well as The Turner House's strong sales: "According to Bookscan, which tracks around 70% of U.S. book sales, her book has sold over 15,000 copies in paperback and hardcover as of April [2016]; anything over 10,000 is generally considered high for literary fiction."

In 2020 she was scheduled to go on a  State Department-sponsored reading tour of Germany.  Flournoy canceled at short notice amid tensions with Iran and published a justification in The New Yorker.

Flournoy attributes her understanding of character development to Zora Neale Hurston’s Mules and Men.

References

External links 

21st-century American novelists
African-American novelists
American women novelists
Iowa Writers' Workshop alumni
University of Southern California alumni
Trinity Washington University faculty
University of Iowa faculty
Year of birth missing (living people)
Living people
Novelists from Iowa
American women academics
21st-century American women writers
21st-century African-American women writers
21st-century African-American writers